David Eugene Junior McDougald (born 12 January 1975 in Big Spring, Texas) is an American-born English footballer who plays for St Ives Town. He has also enjoyed a career as an actor.

Football career
McDougald has played professional football in England for Tottenham Hotspur, Brighton & Hove Albion, Chesterfield, Rotherham United, Millwall, Leyton Orient, Dagenham & Redbridge, Canvey Island, Kettering Town and Histon, as well as in France for SC Toulon. He has also represented the National Game XI.

On 6 October 2008, McDougald signed for St Ives Town in the United Counties Football League Premier Division making his debut for the club as a second-half substitute against local rivals St Neots Town in the Hinchingbrooke Cup. McDougald made an immediate impact and was instrumental in turning around a 2–0 deficit to force the game into extra time. St Ives eventually won the game 4–3 with McDougald scoring two goals. On 3 April McDougald was report on the St Ives Town FC website scoring against Boston Town after 15 minutes in a 5–1 win.

Acting career
McDougald acted in 31 episodes of Dream Team between 2001 and 2006.

References

External links
 
Junior McDougald Fact File
Player profile at UpThePosh

1975 births
Living people
American expatriate soccer players
English footballers
England semi-pro international footballers
Tottenham Hotspur F.C. players
Brighton & Hove Albion F.C. players
Chesterfield F.C. players
Rotherham United F.C. players
Millwall F.C. players
Leyton Orient F.C. players
Dagenham & Redbridge F.C. players
Canvey Island F.C. players
Kettering Town F.C. players
Histon F.C. players
SC Toulon players
English male television actors
People from Big Spring, Texas
American soccer players
Association football forwards